Møbelringen Cup 2008 was held in Norway, in the cities of Oslo, Gjøvik and Lillestrøm. The tournament started on 21 November and finished on 23 November 2008. Norway won the event by winning all their matches.

Results

All times are Central European Time (UTC+1)

All-Star Team 
Goalkeeper:  
Left Wing:   
Back Player: 
Back Player: 
Back Player: 
Right Wing:  
Line Player:

References
Official Site

2008 in handball
2008
2008 in Norwegian sport